The elm cultivar Ulmus 'Klemmer Blanc' was described by Feneau in Bulletin de la Société centrale forestière de Belgique (1902) as an intermediate between 'Klemmer' and 'Belgica', the Belgian Elm.

Description
The leaves are smaller than 'Klemmer', and the trees do not produce root suckers. Moreover, the timber is white and softer than 'Klemmer'.

Cultivation
No specimens are known to survive.

References

Ulmus articles missing images
Ulmus
Missing elm cultivars